The Belgian Coast Guard is made up of an operational branch and an administrative branch. There are three administrative bodies working in close cooperation: the policy-making body, the consultation body and the Coast Guard secretariat.

Policy-making body
The policy-making body coordinates the cooperation between the different parties. It also issues advice for the ministers and both the federal and regional government.

It consists of the heads of division or general directors of all coast guard partners. The chairmanship is alternated between a regional official Jacques D’Havé (head of the agency for Maritime and Coastal Services) and a federal official Alain Lefèvre (general director a.i. of the government’s emergency response centre).

Consultation body
The consultation body assembles information and prepares cases for the policy-making body. The consultation body can also set up working groups. It is chaired by the governor of West-Flanders province. Furthermore, a deputy of each of the coast guard partners takes part in the meetings. These deputies can be engineers, scientists, legal or nautical experts and operational personnel. They have the necessary practical knowledge to prepare cases for the policy-making body.

Secretariat
The secretariat coordinates all activities, both administrative and operational, from organizing meetings to drawing up emergency response plans together with the coast guard partners. The secretariat also assists with outlining policy and is the designated point of contact for coast guard – related organisations abroad.

In addition, the public can consult the secretariat for all queries regarding the North Sea. The motto is: one question, one solution. The secretariat contacts the coast guard partner concerned for the right answer or a suitable solution. The building of the Maritime Rescue and Coordination Centre (MRCC) also houses the secretariat.

External links
 

Coast guards
Government of Belgium
Law enforcement in Belgium
2005 establishments in Belgium